The 1908 United States presidential election in New York took place on November 3, 1908. All 46 contemporary states were part of the 1908 United States presidential election. Voters chose 39 electors to the Electoral College, which selected the president and vice president.

New York was won by the Republican nominees, United States Secretary of War William Howard Taft of Ohio and his running mate Congressman James S. Sherman of New York. Taft and Sherman defeated the Democratic nominees, former Congressman and two-time prior presidential candidate William Jennings Bryan of Nebraska and his running mate Senator John W. Kern of Indiana. Also in the running was the Socialist Party candidate, Eugene V. Debs, who ran with Ben Hanford.

Taft carried New York State with 53.11% of the vote to Bryan's 40.74%, a victory margin of 12.37%. Debs finished a distant third, receiving 2.35% of the vote in the state.

New York weighed in for this election as about 4% more Republican than the national average. The Empire State would prove to be a Republican stronghold during the Fourth Party System, voting for Republican candidates in the presidential elections of that era barring Woodrow Wilson's win four years later.

Results

Results by county

See also
 United States presidential elections in New York
 Presidency of William Howard Taft

References

New York
1908
1908 New York (state) elections